The Gajre ambush or Gajre Massacre occurred when ethnic Albanian rebels of the National Liberation Army killed five soldiers of the Army of the Republic of Macedonia on 5 June 2001 near Gajre, a village in the Šar Mountains, North Macedonia. It represents the one of heaviest death tolls for the government forces in a single incident during the Insurgency in the Republic of Macedonia.

References 

Attacks in Europe in 2001
2001 insurgency in Macedonia
Albanian separatism
Tetovo Municipality
June 2001 events in Europe
Ambushes in Europe
Massacres in North Macedonia